Garrett Lee Mock (born April 25, 1983 in Houston, Texas) is an American former professional baseball pitcher who played in Major League Baseball (MLB) for the Washington Nationals.

Career

Amateur career
Mock attended the University of Houston where he played as part of the Houston Cougars baseball team. In 2003, he played collegiate summer baseball in the Cape Cod Baseball League for the Yarmouth-Dennis Red Sox, where he was named the Eastern division MVP of the league's annual all-star game.

Arizona Diamondbacks
He was the first of his UH class to be selected in the 2004 amateur draft, being chosen by Arizona Diamondbacks in the third round.

Mock began the 2006 season pitching for the Tennessee Smokies of the Double-A Southern League, where he accrued a 4–8 win–loss record and 4.95 earned run average (ERA) in 23 starts.

Washington Nationals

On August 7, 2006, Mock was acquired by the Nationals along with fellow minor league pitcher Matt Chico in a trade for veteran right-handed pitcher Liván Hernández. After joining the Nationals organization, he pitched for the Harrisburg Senators of the Double-A Eastern League, compiling a 10.26 ERA in his first 4 starts, all losses. His 2006 season ended September 2, after undergoing surgery to repair a tear in the patella tendon of his knee.

In 2007, Mock posted a win–loss record of 2–7 and an ERA of 5.12 in 15 appearances for the High Single-A Potomac Nationals, Rookie-Level Gulf Coast Nationals and Double-A Harrisburg Senators. During the 2007–2008 off-season, Mock pitched for the Peoria Javelinas of the Arizona Fall League. On October 23, 2007, Mock was added to the Nationals 40-man roster.

In 2008, after starting the year with the Triple-A Columbus Clippers, Mock made his major league debut on June 8, giving up four earned runs in  innings. Mock was selected for the International League roster at the 2008 Triple-A All-Star Game. On August 7, Mock was recalled by the Nationals from Columbus. He would spend most of the rest of the season as a relief pitcher including a 1.93 ERA in the month of September.

Mock had neck surgery in 2010 and was out most of the season.

Boston Red Sox
The Toronto Blue Jays signed Mock to a minor league contract on December 1, 2011. Mock was later released from his contract with the Blue Jays during the week of February 17, 2012. On March 2, 2012, Mock signed a minor league deal with the Boston Red Sox with an invitation to their minor league camp.

Houston Astros
On August 3, Mock was traded to the Houston Astros for future considerations. Mock was 3–2 with a 3.33 ERA and 5 saves in 35 appearances over  innings with Triple-A Pawtucket before the trade. Mock pitched in 12 games with Triple-A Oklahoma City, striking out 15 over 13 innings.

Return to the Diamondbacks organization
On November 7, 2012, Mock signed a minor-league deal with the Arizona Diamondbacks with an invitation to spring training.

The Diamondbacks released him from his minor league contract on August 18, 2013.

References

External links

1983 births
Living people
Major League Baseball pitchers
Baseball players from Texas
Houston Cougars baseball players
Washington Nationals players
Yakima Bears players
Grayson Vikings baseball players
South Bend Silver Hawks players
Lancaster JetHawks players
Tennessee Smokies players
Harrisburg Senators players
Potomac Nationals players
Gulf Coast Nationals players
Columbus Clippers players
Syracuse Chiefs players
Hagerstown Suns players
Pawtucket Red Sox players
Oklahoma City RedHawks players
Reno Aces players
Peoria Javelinas players
People from Real County, Texas
People from Humble, Texas
Yarmouth–Dennis Red Sox players
North Shore Senior High School (Texas) alumni